Juan Carlos Gangas Lubones (born September 19, 1944) is a Chilean former footballer who played as a winger for clubs of Chile and Bolivia.

Teams
 Universidad de Chile 1964–1967
 Colo-Colo 1968–1970
 Antofagasta Portuario 1971–1972
 Jorge Wilstermann 1973
 Bolívar 1974–1975
 Regional Antofagasta 1976
 Ñublense 1977

Honours
Universidad de Chile
 Chilean Primera División: 1964, 1965, 1967

Colo-Colo
 Chilean Primera División: 1970

Jorge Wilstermann
 Bolivian Primera División: 
 : 1973

External links
 

1944 births
Living people
Footballers from Santiago
Chilean footballers
Association football forwards
Chile youth international footballers
Universidad de Chile footballers
Colo-Colo footballers
C.D. Antofagasta footballers
C.D. Jorge Wilstermann players
Club Bolívar players
Ñublense footballers
Chilean Primera División players
Bolivian Primera División players
Chilean expatriate footballers
Chilean expatriate sportspeople in Bolivia
Expatriate footballers in Bolivia
Chilean football managers
Ñublense managers
Provincial Osorno managers
Lota Schwager managers
O'Higgins F.C. managers
Huachipato managers
Deportes Temuco managers
Chilean Primera División managers
Primera B de Chile managers